Protea longifolia, commonly known as the long-leaf sugarbush, is a shrub of the family Proteaceae that is native to South Africa.

References

longifolia
Flora of South Africa
Taxa named by Henry Cranke Andrews